Knave of Hearts is a 1954 British-French comedy drama film directed by René Clément and starring Gérard Philipe, Valerie Hobson and Joan Greenwood. The film was shot at the Elstree Studios of Associated British and on location across London including Trafalgar Square and Hyde Park. The film's sets were designed by the art director Ralph Brinton. In France it was released as Monsieur Ripois, referencing the title of the original novel by Louis Hémon.

The film was entered into the 1954 Cannes Film Festival, where it won the Special Jury Prize.

Synopsis
The film portrays the adventures of a French philanderer in Paris and London.

Cast
 Gérard Philipe as Andre Ripois
 Natasha Parry as Patricia
 Valerie Hobson as Catherine Ripois
 Joan Greenwood as Norah
 Margaret Johnston as Anne
 Germaine Montero as Marcelle
 Percy Marmont as Catherine's Father
 Diana Decker as Diana
 Bill Shine as Pub Barman
 Eric Pohlmann as Boarding House Proprietor
 Martin Benson as Art 
 Mae Bacon as Mrs. Rose 
 Margo Field as Doris Braddock
 Julie Anslow as Maisie Smith
 Harry Towb as Stewart
 Gerald Campion as Harry
 Judith Nelmes as 	Marcelle
 Arthur Howard as	Priest 
 Eileen Way as Landlady 
 Beryl Cooke as 	Kind Typist

References

Bibliography
 Burton, Alan & Chibnall, Steve. Historical Dictionary of British Cinema. Scarecrow Press, 2013.

External links

1954 films
1954 comedy-drama films
French comedy-drama films
British comedy-drama films
Films directed by René Clément
English-language French films
British black-and-white films
French black-and-white films
Films set in London
Films shot in London
Films shot at Associated British Studios
1950s English-language films
1950s British films
1950s French films